Jaan Puidet (born 4 January 1992) is an Estonian professional basketball player for Real Valladolid of the Spanish LEB Oro. He also represents the Estonia men's national basketball team internationally.

Professional career

Estonia
Jaan Puidet won the Best Young Player award in 2009. In 2011, he won the Korvpalli Meistriliiga title with Kalev/Cramo. From 2011 to 2015, Puidet played for another Estonian league team, TTÜ.

Sweden

In 2015 he signed with Jämtland Basket of the Basketligan. Puidet returned to TTÜ in 2018.

Spain

Despite Puidet started the 2020-2021 season with TalTech team, On 10 December 2020, Puidet accepted the offer from Spanish second division team Real Valladolid and left TalTech Basketball Team.

Estonian national team
Puidet has been participating in international basketball with the Estonia men's national basketball team since 2015.

Career statistics

Domestic leagues

Estonia national team

|-
| style="text-align:left;"| 2008
| style="text-align:left;"| 2008 U-16 European Championship Division B
| style="text-align:left;"| Estonia U-16
| 7 ||  || 28.1 || .392 || .346 || .870 || 7.3 || 1.4 || 1.1 || .9 || 13.0
|-
| style="text-align:left;"| 2009
| style="text-align:left;"| 2009 U-18 European Championship Division B
| style="text-align:left;"| Estonia U-18
| 9 ||  || 29.9 || .387 || .292 || .727 || 5.8 || 1.6 || 1.1 || .3 || 7.0
|-
| style="text-align:left;"| 2010
| style="text-align:left;"| 2010 U-18 European Championship Division B
| style="text-align:left;"| Estonia U-18
| 8 ||  || 20.0 || .385 || .059 || .733 || 5.2 || 1.1 || 1.2 || .5 || 5.2
|-
| style="text-align:left;"| 2011
| style="text-align:left;"| 2011 U-20 European Championship Division B
| style="text-align:left;"| Estonia U-20
| 9 ||  || 19.0 || .440 || .385 || .875 || 7.3 || 1.2 || 1.1 || .5 || 7.0
|-
| style="text-align:left;"| 2012
| style="text-align:left;"| 2012 U-20 European Championship
| style="text-align:left;"| Estonia U-20
| 9 ||  || 26.7 || .417 || .237 || .500 || 4.4 || 1.8 || .8 || .4 || 10.1
|-
| style="text-align:left;"|  2013
| style="text-align:left;"| 2013 Summer Universiade
| style="text-align:left;"| Estonia Universiade
| 8 ||   || 30.1 || .379 || .385 || .812 || 5.8 || 2.6 || .9 || .4 || 7.8
|-
| style="text-align:left;"|  2015
| style="text-align:left;"| 2015 Summer Universiade
| style="text-align:left;"| Estonia Universiade
| 7 ||   || 25.3 || .323 || .130 || .500 || 4.4 || 2.0 || 1.1 || .6 || 7.1
|-
| style="text-align:left;"| 2017
| style="text-align:left;"| 2019 Basketball World Cup Pre-Qualifiers
| style="text-align:left;"| Estonia
| 4 ||  || 11.5 || .273 || .000 || 1.000 || 2.2 || 1.5 || .7 || .0 || 2.0
|-
| style="text-align:left;"| 2017
| style="text-align:left;"| 2019 Basketball World Cup Qualifiers
| style="text-align:left;"| Estonia
| 2 ||  || 3.5 || .000 || .000 || .000 || 1.0 || .5 || .5 || .0 || 0.0

Awards and accomplishments

Professional career
 1× Estonian League champion (2011)
 1x International Students Basketball League champion (2013)
 Estonian Best Young Player (2009)

References

External links
 Jaan Puidet at basket.ee 
 Jaan Puidet at bbl.net
 Jaan Puidet at fiba.com
 Jaan Puidet at eurobasket.com

1992 births
Living people
BC Kalev/Cramo players
CB Valladolid players
Estonian men's basketball players
Jämtland Basket players
KK Pärnu players
Korvpalli Meistriliiga players
Shooting guards
TTÜ KK players
Estonian expatriate basketball people in Sweden
Estonian expatriate basketball people in Spain